Porrhomma is a genus of sheet weavers that was first described by Eugène Louis Simon in 1884.

Species
 it contains twenty-five species, found in Europe and Asia:
Porrhomma altaica Růžička, 2018 – Altai (Russia, Kazakhstan)
Porrhomma boreale (Banks, 1899) – Russia (Urals to Far East), Mongolia, USA (Alaska)
Porrhomma borgesi Wunderlich, 2008 – Azores
Porrhomma cambridgei Merrett, 1994 – England to Italy and Czechia
Porrhomma campbelli F. O. Pickard-Cambridge, 1894 – Europe to Russia (Middle Siberia)
Porrhomma cavernicola (Keyserling, 1886) – USA
Porrhomma convexum (Westring, 1851) (type) – USA, Canada, Greenland, Europe, Caucasus, Russia (Europe, West Siberia), Kazakhstan
Porrhomma egeria Simon, 1884 – Europe
Porrhomma errans (Blackwall, 1841) – Western to Central Europe, Italy
Porrhomma frasassianum Weiss & Sarbu, 2021 – Italy
Porrhomma longjiangense Zhu & Wang, 1983 – Russia (South Siberia to Far East), China
Porrhomma magnum Tanasevitch, 2012 – Russia (South Siberia), Kazakhstan
Porrhomma microcavense Wunderlich, 1990 – Belgium, Netherlands, Germany, Czechia, Slovakia, Russia (Europe)
Porrhomma microphthalmum (O. Pickard-Cambridge, 1871) – Europe, Russia (Europe, Caucasus), Turkey, Iran, Kazakhstan, China
Porrhomma microps (Roewer, 1931) – Europe
Porrhomma montanum Jackson, 1913 – Europe, Russia (Europe to Far East), Korea, Japan
Porrhomma nekolai Růžička, 2018 – Russia (Far East), Canada, USA
Porrhomma oblitum (O. Pickard-Cambridge, 1871) – Europe
Porrhomma ohkawai Saito, 1977 – Japan
Porrhomma pallidum Jackson, 1913 – Europe, Russia (Europe to Far East), Iran, Kazakhstan
Porrhomma profundum M. Dahl, 1939 – Germany, Czechia, Slovakia, Hungary, Romania, Serbia, Bulgaria
Porrhomma pygmaeum (Blackwall, 1834) – Europe, Turkey, Caucasus, Russia (Europe to Far East), Central Asia, Pakistan, Japan
Porrhomma rakanum Yaginuma & Saito, 1981 – Japan
Porrhomma rosenhaueri (L. Koch, 1872) – Western, Southern and Central Europe, Russia (Altai)
Porrhomma terrestre (Emerton, 1882) – Canada, USA

See also
 List of Linyphiidae species (I–P)

References

Araneomorphae genera
Linyphiidae
Spiders of Africa
Spiders of Asia
Spiders of North America